Juan José Sabines Guerrero (born August 20, 1968) is a Mexican politician, son of the former Governor of Chiapas, Juan Sabines Gutiérrez and nephew of the writer Jaime Sabines. Until, 2006 he was member of the Institutional Revolutionary Party (PRI) that carried him to be Municipal President of Tuxtla Gutiérrez, but renounced his membership to the PRI after the party denied him the chance to be a candidate for governor and asked him to finish his term as municipal president. He then became a candidate of the Coalition for the Good of All, composed by the parties PRD, PT and Convergence. He was consul of Mexico in Orlando from June 2015 to December 2018. He studied Political Sciences and Public Administration at the Universidad Iberoamericana, as well as a Diploma in Protection Within the Framework of Consular Diplomacy at Instituto Matias Romero, a Seminar in Update Finance at University of California, Berkeley and studies in Foreign Affairs at UNAM.

Achievements

Against poverty 
 As governor, Chiapas left the first place in extreme poverty to become the 3rd state in the country, whereas 72,000 people came out of extreme poverty.

Environment
 Opened the first biodiesel plant in Mexico, as well as the first line of public transportation with biodiesel in the country, used as transportation for all Heads of State and Ambassadors in the United Nations  Climate Change Conference (COP 16) in Cancun, Mexico, in 2010.
 Achieved the 1st ever commercial flight with Bioturbosina (airplane fuel with bio-diesel), made with Jatropha Curcas Tree, from Mexico City to Tuxtla Gutierrez in 2011.

Sustainable development
 Invented and founded in Chiapas the first ever "Ciudad Rural Sustentable" (Sustainable Rural City), based on the United Nations Millennium Development Goals, in 2009, called "Nuevo Juan del Grijalva". There were 4 total Sustainable Rural Cities founded during his Government in Chiapas.
 Invented the program "Reconversion Productiva", to change the clearing, lumbering and burning practices in Chiapas, in order to harvest fruit trees for the indigenan mountain habitats. Such program reduced forest fires, reforested trees, produced foods and improved their income.

Civil protection
 Founded the first disaster protection school, for prevention of hurricanes, slides and earthquakes. It is located in the old airport of Ocozocoautla, Chiapas.

Education
 Opened 14 university campuses while governor of Chiapas.

Diplomacy
 As consul, for 3 years he, organized the Sheriff Academy for Crime Prevention in Spanish at the Consulate of Mexico in Orlando, Florida with an attendance of over 300 people from 7 different countries.
 Helped in the agreement of St. Petersburg, Florida  and Isla Mujeres, Mexico of being sister cities.

See also
List of Mexican state governors
2006 Chiapas state election
 List of municipal presidents of Tuxtla Gutiérrez

External links
 Chiapas State Government website
 CONAGO

Universidad Iberoamericana alumni
Governors of Chiapas
Politicians from the State of Mexico
Living people
Institutional Revolutionary Party politicians
1968 births
21st-century Mexican politicians
Municipal presidents in Chiapas